Corinthians F.C. was a South African football club based in Johannesburg which competed in the National Football League.

References

National Football League (South Africa) clubs
Defunct soccer clubs in South Africa